Střílky Castle is a ruined castle near the village of Střílky in the Zlín Region of the Czech Republic. John the Blind gave Henry of Lipá the castle in 1321.

See also
List of castles in the Zlín Region

References

External links

 Střílky Castle at hrady.cz

Castles in the Zlín Region
Ruined castles in the Czech Republic